Chengdu Qbao Football Club was a Chinese football club that participated in the China League Two division under licence from the Chinese Football Association (CFA). The team is based in Chengdu, Sichuan.

History
The club was established by Qbao Group as Nanjing Qianbao F.C. on 24 January 2014. After a stellar 2015 season, they relocated to the city of Chengdu and changed their name to Chengdu Qbao F.C. on 8 January 2016. Chengdu Qbao withdrew from League Two in 2018 when Qbao Group was under investigation with illegal fund raising scandal.

Name history
2014–2015 Nanjing Qianbao F.C. 南京钱宝
2016–2018 Chengdu Qbao F.C. 成都钱宝

Current squad

Coaching staff

Managerial history
  Zhao Faqing (2014–2016)
  Zhang Weizhe (2017)
  José Carlos Granero (2018)

Results
All-time League Rankings

As of the end of 2017 season.

 In group stage.

Key
 Pld = Played
 W = Games won
 D = Games drawn
 L = Games lost
 F = Goals for
 A = Goals against
 Pts = Points
 Pos = Final position

 DNQ = Did not qualify
 DNE = Did not enter
 NH = Not Held
 – = Does Not Exist
 R1 = Round 1
 R2 = Round 2
 R3 = Round 3
 R4 = Round 4

 F = Final
 SF = Semi-finals
 QF = Quarter-finals
 R16 = Round of 16
 Group = Group stage
 GS2 = Second Group stage
 QR1 = First Qualifying Round
 QR2 = Second Qualifying Round
 QR3 = Third Qualifying Round

References

External links
 Chengdu Qbao official site

Football clubs in Chengdu
Defunct football clubs in China